Flattie may refer to:
Geary 18, an American sailboat design, originally called the Flattie
Selenopidae, a class of spiders